Jan Vrba is the name of:

Jan Vrba (bobsledder), Czech bobsledder
Jan Vrba (politician), Czech politician